2020 is the fourth year in the history of Legacy Fighting Alliance, a mixed martial arts promotion based in the United States.

Event list

Legacy Fighting Alliance 80: Garcia vs. Marsical

Legacy Fighting Alliance 80: Garcia vs. Marsical was the eighty-first event of Legacy Fighting Alliance and took place on January 17, 2020. It aired on UFC Fight Pass.
 
Results

Legacy Fighting Alliance 81: Emmers vs. Barbosa

Legacy Fighting Alliance 81: Emmers vs. Barbosa was the eighty-second event of Legacy Fighting Alliance and took place on January 31, 2020. It aired on UFC Fight Pass.

Results

Legacy Fighting Alliance 82: Polizzi vs. Pogues

Legacy Fighting Alliance 82: Polizzi vs. Pogues was the eighty-third event of Legacy Fighting Alliance and took place on February 21, 2020. It aired on UFC Fight Pass.

Results

Legacy Fighting Alliance 83: Jackson vs. Chaulet

Legacy Fighting Alliance 83: Jackson vs. Chaulet was the eighty-fourth event of Legacy Fighting Alliance and took place on March 6, 2020. It aired on UFC Fight Pass.

Results

Legacy Fighting Alliance 84: Gonzales vs. Childers

Legacy Fighting Alliance 84: Gonzales vs. Childers was the eighty-fifth event of Legacy Fighting Alliance and took place on July 10, 2020. It aired on UFC Fight Pass.

Results

Legacy Fighting Alliance 85: Hughes vs. Demopoulos

Legacy Fighting Alliance 85: Hughes vs. Demopoulos was the eighty-sixth event of Legacy Fighting Alliance and took place on July 17, 2020. It aired on UFC Fight Pass.

Results

Legacy Fighting Alliance 86: Fischer vs. Flick

Legacy Fighting Alliance 86: Fischer vs. Flick was the eighty-seventh event of Legacy Fighting Alliance and took place on July 24, 2020. It aired on UFC Fight Pass.

Results

Legacy Fighting Alliance 87: Logan vs. Rosales

Legacy Fighting Alliance 87: Logan vs. Rosales was the eighty-eighth event of Legacy Fighting Alliance and took place on July 31, 2020. It aired on UFC Fight Pass.

Results

Legacy Fighting Alliance 88: Willis vs. de Jesus

Legacy Fighting Alliance 88: Willis vs. de Jesus was the eighty-ninth event of Legacy Fighting Alliance and took place on August 21, 2020. It aired on UFC Fight Pass.

Results

Legacy Fighting Alliance 89: Moore vs. Giannetti

Legacy Fighting Alliance 89: Moore vs. Giannetti was the ninetieth event of Legacy Fighting Alliance and took place on August 28, 2020. It aired on UFC Fight Pass.

Results

Legacy Fighting Alliance 90: Lazishvili vs. Steele

Legacy Fighting Alliance 90: Lazishvili vs. Steele was the ninety-first event of Legacy Fighting Alliance and took place on September 4, 2020. It aired on UFC Fight Pass.

Results

Legacy Fighting Alliance 91: Njokuani vs. Torres

Legacy Fighting Alliance 91: Njokuani vs. Torres was the ninety-second event of Legacy Fighting Alliance and took place on September 11, 2020. It aired on UFC Fight Pass.

Results

Legacy Fighting Alliance 92: Wirth vs. Askar

Legacy Fighting Alliance 92: Wirth vs. Askar was the ninety-third event of Legacy Fighting Alliance and took place on October 2, 2020. It aired on UFC Fight Pass.

Results

Legacy Fighting Alliance 93: Petroski vs. Jeffery

Legacy Fighting Alliance 93: Jeffery vs. Petroski was the ninety-fourth event of Legacy Fighting Alliance and took place on October 16, 2020. It aired on UFC Fight Pass.

Results

Legacy Fighting Alliance 94: Demopoulos vs. Godinez

Legacy Fighting Alliance 94: Demopoulos vs. Godinez was the ninety-fifth event of Legacy Fighting Alliance and took place on October 30, 2020. It aired on UFC Fight Pass.

Results

Legacy Fighting Alliance 95: Pereira vs. Powell

Legacy Fighting Alliance 95: Pereira vs. Powell was the ninety-sixth event of Legacy Fighting Alliance and took place on November 20, 2020. It aired on UFC Fight Pass.

Results

Legacy Fighting Alliance 96: Mendonça vs. Dagvadorj

Legacy Fighting Alliance 96: Mendonça vs. Dagvadorj was the ninety-seventh event of Legacy Fighting Alliance and took place on December 4, 2020. It aired on UFC Fight Pass.

Results

References

External links
  Legacy Fighting Alliance Official website

Legacy Fighting Alliance
2020 in mixed martial arts